Euriphene regula, the panda nymph, is a butterfly in the family Nymphalidae. It is found in Cameroon and the Democratic Republic of the Congo (Équateur). The habitat consists of forests.

References

External links
Type images at Royal Museum for Central Africa
Type images Euriphene panda at Royal Museum for Central Africa

Butterflies described in 1994
Euriphene